The West Ashley Greenway is a rail trail in Charleston, South Carolina. It stretches across the West Ashley neighborhood from Main Road in the west to Folly Road in the east. It is a straight and mostly paved path utilized for walking, jogging, roller skating, and off-street cycling. It is a contributing segment of the East Coast Greenway. In 2019, the U.S. Department of Transportation gave the city of Charleston a $18 million grant to build a pedestrian bridge across the Ashley River connecting West Ashley to downtown Charleston. The planned pedestrian bridge may eventually connect with the Lowcountry Lowline.

The former railway, chartered in 1853, which was known as The Croghans Branch of the Atlantic Coast Line Railroad. was abandoned by Seaboard Coast Line Railroad in 1981 and over time, the City of Charleston entered into leasing agreements with utility companies that took over the right-of-way to allow for public access.  The last section of the trail was completed in 2007.

References

External links
 Official website
 Description from SCTrails.net
 Friends of the West Ashley Greenway

Rail trails in South Carolina
Protected areas of Charleston County, South Carolina
East Coast Greenway
Transportation in Charleston County, South Carolina
Bike paths in South Carolina
Hiking trails in South Carolina